This is a list of insurance companies in Hong Kong.
Source: 
Source:

See also
List of banks in Hong Kong

External links
Statistics, Office of the Commissioner of Insurance
Insurance Companies in Hong Kong

 
Insurance
Hong Kong